Hugh Atkinson may refer to:
Hugh Atkinson (novelist) (1924–1994), Australian novelist, journalist and documentary maker
Hugh Atkinson (footballer) (born 1960), Irish former professional footballer who played as a defender
Hugh Craig Atkinson (1933–1986), American librarian known for his innovations in library automation and cooperation